D.O.A. is a 1988 American neo-noir mystery thriller film and a remake of the 1950 film noir of the same name. While it shares the same premise, it has a different story and characters. The film was directed by Rocky Morton and Annabel Jankel, and scripted by Charles Edward Pogue. The writers of the original film, Russell Rouse and Clarence Greene, share story credit with Pogue. It stars Dennis Quaid, Meg Ryan and Charlotte Rampling, and was filmed in Austin, Texas and San Marcos, Texas.

Plot
A man staggers into a police station to report a murder. When the desk sergeant asks who was murdered, he answers: "I was."  The man, Professor Dexter Cornell (Dennis Quaid), sits down to video-tape his account.

Thirty-six hours previously, Cornell is on campus. He is a college professor, was once a promising writer, made his name and is secure in his tenure, but he has spent the last four years going through the motions and playing it safe. Cornell helps his friend Hal Petersham (Daniel Stern) with his first book.

While Cornell is in his office, a promising student, Nick Lang (Robert Knepper), jumps off a building right outside his office window in an apparent suicide. This, coupled with the depressing Christmas season, unseasonably hot weather, and a pending divorce from his estranged wife Gail (Jane Kaczmarek) who he suspects was having an affair with Lang, leads Cornell to seek out the local bars for a night of heavy drinking. There he meets admiring student Sydney Fuller (Meg Ryan) and they proceed to get drunk.

The next morning, Cornell, feeling his sickness is more than just a hangover, stops by the campus medical clinic for a checkup. After running some tests, they discover that he has been poisoned and has 36 hours to live. An incredulous Cornell staggers out to try to make sense of it all.

Aided by Fuller, whom he kidnaps by super-gluing himself to her arm, he attempts to recreate the events of the previous night hoping to discover who could have murdered him. The list of suspects includes his wife, who is also the victim of a murder, which the police make half-hearted efforts to pin on Cornell.

It is learned that Lang was not a suicide but was also murdered. Cornell also suspects Lang's mentor; the wealthy widow Mrs. Fitzwaring (Charlotte Rampling). Bernard (Christopher Neame) the Fitzwarings' chauffeur and Graham Corey (Jay Patterson), a jealous co-worker.

In a subplot, it is explained that Lang's college tuition was being paid for by Fitzwaring; despite having shot Lang's father years ago in self defense after he broke in to her home and killed her husband. Lang's death is a harsh blow to both Fitzwaring and her irresponsible daughter, Cookie, who in a drunken rant reveals her and Lang's sexual escapades.

Later, after a skirmish with Bernard results in Cookie's unfortunate death, Fitzwaring finally reveals to Cornell that Lang was her son from a previous marriage she walked away from to marry her wealthy late husband, without actually finalising the divorce with her former spouse.  When the jilted lover brought this revelation to Mr Fitzwaring, he threatened to cut her off from their daughter, forcing Fitzwaring to shoot both men to silence them.  With both her son and daughter dead, Fitzwarring ends her own life through suicide.

Back at the police station, Cornell has solved the crime. His friend Hal Petersham had read and was so impressed by Nick Lang's manuscript that he decided to kill Lang and steal the novel for himself. However, this involved killing anyone who knew that Lang was the original author, including Cornell and his wife, who was in possession of a copy Lang had given her.  The tragic irony for Cornell is that due to weariness, he instead gave Lang's novel a pass without ever having read it. Petersham however shows no remorse, callously stating it was Cornell's own fault that he believed he had.  After a scuffle, Cornell shoots Petersham, who then falls to his death out his office window. Cornell resigns himself to his fate.

Cast
 Dennis Quaid as Professor Dexter Cornell
 Meg Ryan as Sydney Fuller
 Daniel Stern as Hal Petersham
 Charlotte Rampling as Mrs. Fitzwaring
 Jane Kaczmarek as Gail Cornell
 Christopher Neame as Bernard
 Robin Johnson as Cookie Fitzwaring
 Robert Knepper as Nicholas Lang
 Brion James as Detective Ulmer
 Jack Kehoe as Detective Brockton
 Jay Patterson as Graham Corey
 John Hawkes as Sloane

Reception

Box office 
D.O.A. debuted at No. 3 at the US box office. By the end of its run, the film earned a total of $12.7 million in domestic sales.

Critical response
D.O.A. opened to mixed reviews. On Rotten Tomatoes, it has an approval rating of 60% based on 20 reviews, with an average rating of 5.1/10. Audiences surveyed by CinemaScore gave the film a grade "B−" on scale of A to F.

Film critic Roger Ebert gave the film three stars out of four, calling it a "witty and literate thriller".
 
Caryn James of The New York Times called it "one of the season's biggest disappointments".

References

External links

 
 
 
 

1988 films
1980s mystery thriller films
1980s psychological thriller films
American mystery thriller films
Remakes of American films
American neo-noir films
Films about writers
Films shot in New Orleans
Films shot in Austin, Texas
Films set in Texas
Touchstone Pictures films
1988 directorial debut films
Films with screenplays by Charles Edward Pogue
Films directed by Annabel Jankel
Films directed by Rocky Morton
1980s English-language films
1980s American films